Armelino Donizetti Quagliato, best known as Zetti (born 10 January 1965 in Porto Feliz), is a Brazilian football pundit and retired manager and footballer, who played as a goalkeeper.

Playing career

Club
Zetti played with São Paulo from 1990 to 1996. Arguably one of the most successful goalkeepers in the club's history he won 1 Brazilian championship, 2 Copas Libertadores and 2 Intercontinental Cups during this period. Other clubs played for include Guarani, Toledo, Londrina, Palmeiras, Santos, Fluminense and Sport.

International
He was called up to the Brazil national squad for the 1994 FIFA World Cup. He made 17 appearances for his country during the early 1990s.

Managerial career
Zetti was the manager of Esporte Clube Juventude in the Brazilian league second division. On May 7, 2009, he was hired as the manager of Paraná Clube, replacing previous coach Velloso.

Honours

Club
São Paulo
Campeonato Brasileiro Série A: 1991
Campeonato Paulista: 1991, 1992
Copa Libertadores: 1992, 1993
Supercopa Libertadores: 1993
Recopa Sudamericana: 1993, 1994
Intercontinental Cup: 1992, 1993
Copa Master de CONMEBOL: 1996

Santos
Torneio Rio-São Paulo: 1997

International
Brazil
FIFA World Cup: 1994

References

External links
 Zetti's blog (in Portuguese)

1965 births
Living people
Brazilian footballers
Brazilian football managers
Association football goalkeepers
Campeonato Brasileiro Série A players
Fluminense FC players
Guarani FC players
Sociedade Esportiva Palmeiras players
Santos FC players
São Paulo FC players
Londrina Esporte Clube players
Sport Club do Recife players
1993 Copa América players
1994 FIFA World Cup players
FIFA World Cup-winning players
Brazil international footballers
Doping cases in association football
Esporte Clube Bahia managers
Guarani FC managers
Clube Atlético Mineiro managers
Esporte Clube Juventude managers
Brazilian people of Italian descent